The Spring Stakes was an American Thoroughbred horse race run on dirt for twenty-five years between 1886 and 1910 at Sheepshead Bay Race Track in Sheepshead Bay, Brooklyn, New York. Open to two-year-old horses, from inception through 1889 it was raced over a distance of six furlongs and then from 1890 through 1909 it was run on the futurity course at a distance of 5 ¾ furlongs. Its final running in 1910 was at a distance of five furlongs.

Historical notes
The inaugural running of the Spring Stakes took place on June 22, 1886. It was won by Tremont, a colt would who would finish the year having won all thirteen of his starts.

Scottish Chieftain, the 1896 winner, went on to win the 1897 Belmont Stakes which race would become the third leg of the U.S. Triple Crown series.

The 1900 edition of the Spring Stakes was won by Richard T. Wilson Jr.'s  The Parader who would go on to win the 1901 Preakness Stakes, a race that would become the second leg of the U.S. Triple Crown series.

1909: Eddie Dugan beat Eddie Dugan
The Spring Stakes of 1909 was won by Uncas Chief who went wire-to-wire under one of the country's top jockeys Eddie Dugan. Running second and in close pursuit throughout was a colt owned by Sam Hildreth named Eddie Dugan to honor the jockey.

The End of a Race and of a Racetrack
Passage of the Hart–Agnew anti-betting legislation by the New York Legislature under Republican Governor Charles Evans Hughes led to a state-wide shutdown of racing in 1911 and 1912. A February 21, 1913 ruling by the New York Supreme Court, Appellate Division saw horse racing return in 1913. However, it was too late for the Sheepshead Bay horse racing facility and it never reopened.

Records
Speed record:
 1:09 2/5 @ 5 ¾ furlongs: Strathmeath (1890)
 1:13 1/5 @ 6 furlongs: Chapultepec (1907)

Most wins by a jockey:
 3 – Edward Garrison (1889, 1892, 1894)
 3 – Fred Taral (1891, 1896, 1897)

Most wins by a trainer:
 3 – Frank McCabe (1886, 1888, 1889)
 3 – John J. Hyland (1894, 1895, 1897)

Most wins by an owner:
 3 – Dwyer Brothers Stable (1894, 1895, 1897)

Winners

References

Discontinued horse races in New York City
Sheepshead Bay Race Track
Flat horse races for two-year-olds
Recurring sporting events established in 1886
Recurring sporting events disestablished in 1910
1886 establishments in New York (state)
1910 disestablishments in New York (state)